Crateuas (modern ), also called Craterus, was according to some ancient sources the lover, and killer, of Archelaus I of Macedon, whom he killed to become a king himself. According to another version, Crateuas killed the king because Archelaus had promised to give him one of his daughters in marriage, but later gave her to someone else. A third version asserts that Archelaus was unintentionally struck by Crateuas during a hunt. Modern historians view the idea that Crateuas actually reigned as king of Macedon to be "obviously absurd".

Notes

399 BC deaths
Courtiers of Archelaus I of Macedon
Old Macedonian kingdom
Year of birth unknown